In geometry, a rectified prism (also rectified bipyramid) is one of an infinite set of polyhedra, constructed as a rectification of an n-gonal prism, truncating the vertices down to the midpoint of the original edges. In Conway polyhedron notation, it is represented as aPn, an ambo-prism. The lateral squares or rectangular faces of the prism become squares or rhombic faces, and new isosceles triangle faces are truncations of the original vertices.

Elements
An n-gonal form has 3n vertices, 6n edges, and 2+3n faces: 2 regular n-gons, n rhombi, and 2n triangles.

Forms
The rectified square prism is the same as a semiregular cuboctahedron.

Rectified star prisms also exist, like a 5/2 form:

Dual

The dual of a rectified prism is a joined prism or joined bipyramid, in Conway polyhedron notation. The join operation adds vertices at the center of faces, and replaces edges with rhombic faces between original and the neighboring face centers. The joined square prism is the same topology as the rhombic dodecahedron. The joined triangular prism is the Herschel graph.

See also
 Rectified antiprism

External links
Conway Notation for Polyhedra Try: aPn and jPn, where n=3,4,5,6... example aP4 is a rectified square prism, and jP4 is a joined square prism.

Polyhedra